Liscolman is a small townland in the civil parish of Liscolman, in the Barony of Shillelagh, in County Wicklow, Ireland. As of the 2011 census, the townland had a population of 65 people.

References

Townlands of County Wicklow